WEKC (710 AM) was a radio station which last broadcast a gospel music format in Williamsburg, Kentucky, United States. The station broadcast during daytime hours only, because it shared the same frequency as "clear channel" station WOR in New York City. WEKC was last owned by Gerald Parks.

History
The Williamsburg Broadcasting Corporation was granted a construction permit for a new 250-watt radio station on 710 kHz on May 5, 1981. 

The last licensee, Gerald Parks, failed to renew it in 2020, causing the station to be deleted on August 3 of that year. The call letters were then adopted by the repeater of WEKU in Corbin.

References

External link
FCC Station Search: DWEKC (Facility ID: 72790)

EKC
EKC
Radio stations established in 1981
1981 establishments in Kentucky
Defunct radio stations in the United States
Radio stations disestablished in 2020
2020 disestablishments in Kentucky
EKC